Bronwyn Taylor (known as Bronnie Taylor), an Australian politician, is the New South Wales  Minister for Women, the Minister for Regional Health, and the Minister for Mental Health in the Perrottet ministry, since December 2021. Taylor has served as the Deputy Leader of the National Party in New South Wales since October 2021. She has been a Member of the New South Wales Legislative Council since 2015, representing The Nationals.

Previously, Taylor was the Minister for Mental Health, Regional Youth and Women in the second Berejiklian ministry Before entering parliament, she served on the Cooma-Monaro Shire Council.

Background and early career
Taylor is the daughter of Ward Washington who died of pancreatic cancer. She studied nursing at the University of Sydney, and developed specialty in the field of both palliative care and oncology. She was one of the original Clinical Nurse Consultants appointed for the McGrath Foundation and then worked for NSW Health until June 2014. Her final nursing appointment before entering parliament was Director of Cancer Services for the Southern New South Wales Local Health District. Elected to Cooma-Monaro Shire Council in 2010, Taylor became Deputy Mayor in 2011 was nominated for a 2013 award to recognise the outstanding contributions and achievements of women in local government.

Political career 

Taylor was elected a Member of the Legislative Council at the 2015 state election.

Taylor previously served on several standing committees, having been the Chair of the Standing Committee on Social issues, and previously sat on the Joint Select Committee of Companion Animal Breeding Practices in New South Wales. On 25 August 2016, Taylor was appointed to the position of Parliamentary Secretary for Southern NSW and Regional Communications. Following the 2019 state election, Taylor was appointed as the Minister for Mental Health, Regional Youth and Women in the second Berejiklian ministry with effect from 2 April 2019; and in December 2021, her portfolios were changed to Minister for Women, Minister for Regional Health, and Minister for Mental Health.

Personal life

Taylor is married to Duncan Taylor and together they have two daughters, Hannah and Holly. Taylor is the sister-in-law of Angus Taylor.

References

 

Living people
Members of the New South Wales Legislative Council
National Party of Australia members of the Parliament of New South Wales
New South Wales local councillors
University of Sydney alumni
Year of birth missing (living people)
21st-century Australian politicians
Women members of the New South Wales Legislative Council
Women local councillors in Australia
21st-century Australian women politicians